Predrag Stanimirović (born 9 September 1995) is a Serbian footballer, who plays as a defender for Železničar Pančevo.

Career
Stanimirović joined FK Smederevo 1924 in February 2019.

References

External links
 
 Predrag Stanimirović stats at utakmica.rs 
 

1995 births
Living people
Footballers from Belgrade
Association football defenders
Serbian footballers
FK Dinamo Pančevo players
FK Voždovac players
FK Sinđelić Beograd players
FK Zemun players
FK Smederevo players
Serbian First League players
Serbian SuperLiga players